Katsuhiro Suzuki may refer to:
 Katsuhiro Suzuki (footballer)
 Katsuhiro Suzuki (actor)